Husband and Wife is a 1916 American silent drama film directed by Barry O'Neil and starring Ethel Clayton, Holbrook Blinn and Madge Evans.

Cast
 Ethel Clayton as Doris Baker
 Holbrook Blinn as Richard Baker
 Madge Evans as Bessie
 Montagu Love as Patrick Alliston
 Emmett Corrigan as Ralph Knight
 Dion Titheradge as Porter Baker
 Gerda Holmes as Mrs. Prescott
 Alec B. Francis as James Watson
 Frank Beamish as Fred Schrieber

References

Bibliography
 Goble, Alan. The Complete Index to Literary Sources in Film. Walter de Gruyter, 1999.

External links
 

1916 films
1916 drama films
1910s English-language films
American silent feature films
Silent American drama films
American black-and-white films
Films directed by Barry O'Neil
World Film Company films
1910s American films